Frederick G. Katzmann (September 12, 1875 – October 15, 1953) was an American attorney and politician from Massachusetts who served as district attorney for Norfolk and Plymouth counties. He prosecuted Nicola Sacco and Bartolomeo Vanzetti for armed robbery and murder in a case that drew worldwide attention.

Early life
Katzmann was born on September 12, 1875 in Roxbury. He graduated from Boston Latin School in 1892 and Harvard College in 1896. From 1896 to 1902 he worked as an assistant superintendent of the Hyde Park, Denham and Milton Light and Power Company. In 1902 he graduated from the Boston University School of Law.

Political career
From 1907 to 1908, Katzmann represented the 3rd Norfolk District in the Massachusetts House of Representatives. He also served as chairman of the Hyde Park Republican committee.

Legal career
Katzmann began his legal career in the office of Richard S. Dow. He later opened his office with his brother Percy A. Katzmann in Hyde Park. The two opened a second office in Boston and in 1905 former district attorney Thomas E. Grover joined the firm. In December 20, 1909 he was appointed as an assistant district attorney for the southeastern district (Norfolk and Plymouth counties).

On January 3, 1917 Katzmann was sworn in as district attorney. In 1921 he prosecuted Nicola Sacco and Bartolomeo Vanzetti for armed robbery and the murder of a security guard and paymaster during an armed robbery. Sacco and Vanzetti were found guilty and executed. Katzmann left office in 1923 and returned to private practice. However, he remained involved in later phases the Sacco and Vanzetti case by representing the government as a special assistant to the district attorney.

Banking
In addition to his work as an attorney, Katzmann was also the longtime president of the Hyde Park Savings Bank as well as a trustee of the International Trust Company.

Death
On October 15, 1953, Katzmann collapsed during a civil trial in Norfolk Superior Court. He died that night in Roslindale General Hospital.

References

1875 births
1953 deaths
American bank presidents
County district attorneys in Massachusetts
Boston University School of Law alumni
Harvard University alumni
Republican Party members of the Massachusetts House of Representatives
Lawyers from Boston
Politicians from Boston
Businesspeople from Boston
Sacco and Vanzetti
Boston Latin School alumni
People from Roxbury, Boston